Antsiranana Bay (also known as Diego-Suarez Bay) is a natural bay that stretches close to  north to south along the northeast coast of Madagascar. The bay, protected by a narrow inlet that provides shelter from strong Indian Ocean winds, is believed to be the result of a submerging coastline or a drowned river valley that formed many peninsulas around the bay. 

The bay's principal city, Antsiranana, is located on a headland.

History 
The bay was first recorded by European explorers in 1500; sailors in the service of Portugal named the bay for the leader of their expedition, Diogo Soares. The bay was later used for shelter by a number of pirates and privateers during the Golden Age of Piracy, and it has been speculated as a possible location of the legendary pirate colony Libertalia.

References

External links
 
 Sea-seek.com: nautical map of the Bay of Diego Suarez

Bays of Madagascar
Diana Region